Charles Lee (born November 18, 1977) was an American sprinting athlete. He was a four-time All-American short sprinter at the University of Southern California in the late-1990s.

Early life 
Lee was born in Nashville, Tennessee, and raised in Pacoima neighborhood of Los Angeles. He attended Cleveland High School and Los Angeles Valley College. As a youth, Lee was a member of the North Valley Golden Bears Track Club and Los Angeles Jets Track Club.

College career 
He is the record holder in both the 100 meters and 200 meters at both schools. Lee went on to the University of Southern California (coached by John Henry Johnson and Ron Allice) where he ranked as a top-50 sprinter in the world and earned All-American status six times as both a solo sprinter and relay runner throughout his college career. Lee graduated from USC in 1999.

Accomplishments

 Los Angeles City Section Champion 200 Meters - 1995
 California Interscholastic Federation All State Honors 200 Meters - 1995
 AAU Junior Olympic Games Medalist 100 Meters 200 Meters 4X100 & 4X400 Relays - 1996
 USATF Youth Nationals Gold Medalist 100 meters 4X100 & 4X400 Relays - 1996
 JUCO All-American 100 Meters - 1997
 JUCO All-American 200 Meters - 1997
 NCAA Division I All-American 200 Meters - 1998
 NCAA Division I All-American 4 x 100 Meter Relay Team - 1999
 NCAA Division I All-American 4 x 400 Meter Relay Team - 1999
 NCAA Division I All-American 200 Meter - 1999
 Texas Relays Champion 1600 Meter Relay - 1999
 Pacific-10 Conference Champion - 1999
 University of Southern California Track & Field Team MVP - 1999
 Los Angeles Valley College Record Holder - 100 Meters & 200 Meters
 Los Angeles Valley College Athletic Hall Of Fame Inductee - 2011
 Western State Conference Champion - 1996 1997
 USA Track & Field National Meet Qualifier - 1995 1996 1997 1998 1999 2000 2001 2002 2003 2004 2005
 USA Track & Field National Meet Semi Finalist - 1998 1999
 USA Track & Field Olympic Trials Qualifier - 1996 2000 2004

References

CSTV

USC American list

USC 1998-1999

LA Valley College

1977 births
American male sprinters
Living people